Nationality words link to articles with information on the nation's poetry or literature (for instance, Irish or France).

Events

Works published
 Robert Aylet, Divine, and Moral Speculations in Metrical Numbers, Upon Various Subjects, including previously published verses along with "The Song of Songs" and "The Brides Ornaments", apparently published in this book for the first time
 John Playford, A Breefe Introduction to the Skills of Musick for Song & Violl, verse and music
 The Harmonie of the Muses; Or, The Gentlemans and Ladies Choisest Recreation, an anthology from nine contributors; includes several by John Donne, "Elegy XVII" (here titled "Loves Progress by Dr Don) and "Elegy XIX: To His Mistress Going to Bed" (here titled "An Elegie made by J.D."), as well as Donne's "A Valediction: forbidding Mourning", "Loves Diet", "The Prohibition" and "The Will", with other poems also attributed to "J.D.", "Dr. Don" or "Dr. Joh. Don"

Births
Death years link to the corresponding "[year] in poetry" article:
 January 20 – Michiel de Swaen (died 1707), Dutch surgeon, rhetorician and poet
 January 22 – Sir Richard Blackmore (died 1729), English poet and physician
 November 27 – Friedrich von Canitz (died 1699), German poet and diplomat

Deaths
Birth years link to the corresponding "[year] in poetry" article:
 February 8 – Jean-Louis Guez de Balzac (born 1597), French writer and poet writing verses in both French and Latin
 May – Germain Habert (born 1615),  French churchman and poet
 June 27 – Johannes Valentinus Andreae (born 1586), German Rosicrucian
 November 30 – William Habington (born 1605), English poet
 December 5 – Jean François Sarrazin (born 1611), French satirist and poet
 Also:
 Giacomo Badoaro (born 1602), Venetian nobleman and poet
 Alexander Ross (born 1591), Scottish poet, author and controversialist

See also

 Poetry
 17th century in poetry
 17th century in literature

Notes

17th-century poetry
Poetry